Eduardo "Ed" Motta (born August 17, 1971) is a Brazilian MPB, rock, soul, funk and jazz musician. He is the nephew of late singer-songwriter Tim Maia.

Career
Son of Luzia Motta, sister of Tim Maia and Antonio Motta, from an early age listened to disco, soul and funk, later leaning to rock, of which he became profoundly knowledgeable at the time.
His musical career started as vocalist of the hard rock band Kabbalah, After hearing Jeff Beck's album "Blow by Blow", he realized that the British guitarist had soul and funk influences.  Still in his teens, he abandoned his studies to dedicate to music, now fascinated by black music. He was a DJ and produced the fanzine "Curto Circuito", until he met guitarist Luiz Fernando Comprido, with whom he later formed the "Expresso Realengo", later renamed as "Conexão Japeri", and recorded the first album in 1988.

In 1990 Motta departed to begin his solo career, recording his debut Um Contrato Com Deus, where he played almost all the instruments by himself. Since then he has released several solo albums. In 1997 he supplied the soundtrack to the film, Pequeno Dicionário Amoroso (The Book of Love). In 1994 lived in New York for a year. There he recorded an album with American musicians that has not been released yet. He discovered the universes of classical music, which eventually reflected on his musical conception. Once opposed to Brazilian music, he discovered that foreign artists had recorded Brazilian songs, such as recordings of Francis Hime's Minha by jazz artist Bill Evans, and discovered a partnership between Brazilian Marcos Valle and American Leon Ware, famous for composing the song I Wanna Be Where You Are, recorded by Michael Jackson.

In 1999, he translated Phil Collins's songs for the Disney film Tarzan into Brazilian Portuguese.

His album Aystelum was nominated for the Latin Grammy Awards of 2006 in the Latin jazz category.

Motta has worked with Roy Ayers, 4 Hero, Seu Jorge, Eliane Elias, Incognito, Bo Diddley and Ryuichi Sakamoto amongst others.

His work covers a variety of genres from jazz to popular Brazilian music, rock to Hollywood film soundtracks, funk, classical music, AOR, bossa nova and reggae.

Selected discography

Others
 Conexao Japeri (WEA) 1988
 Ao Vivo (live) (WEA) 1993
 Ao Vivo (live) (Trama) 2006

References

External links
  – official site
 Ed Motta at All Brazilian Music
 
 

1971 births
Living people
Música Popular Brasileira pianists
Brazilian jazz pianists
Brazilian rock musicians
Musicians from Rio de Janeiro (city)
Brazilian male musicians
Male jazz musicians
Brazilian soul singers
Brazilian funk singers
20th-century pianists
21st-century pianists
Male pianists
20th-century Brazilian male singers
20th-century Brazilian singers
21st-century Brazilian male singers
21st-century Brazilian singers